Wooldridge may refer to the following:

People

Adrian Wooldridge, Washington bureau chief of the Economist
Alexander Penn Wooldridge (1847–1930), mayor of Austin, Texas
Billy Wooldridge (1878–1945), English footballer who spent his career with Wolverhampton Wanderers 
Charles Thomas Wooldridge (1866–1896), immortalised in The Ballad of Reading Gaol
Dean Wooldridge (1913–2006), prominent engineer in the aerospace industry
George B. Wooldridge, the business manager of the first blackface minstrel troupe
Harry Ellis Wooldridge (1845–1917), English musical antiquary and Slade Professor of Fine Art
Hugh Wooldridge, director, producer
Ian Wooldridge (1932–2007), British sports journalist
Jeffrey Wooldridge (born 1960), American econometrician
Joel Wooldridge (born 1979), American bridge player
John Wooldridge (1919–1958), British film composer
Margaret Wooldridge, American combustion engineer
Mary Wooldridge (born 1967), Australian politician of the Liberal Party 
Michael Wooldridge (born 1956), Australian doctor and former Health Minister
Mike Wooldridge (broadcaster), British journalist for BBC News
Sidney William Wooldridge (1900–1963), English geologist and physical geographer
Sue Ellen Wooldridge (born 1961), American attorney and former political appointee
Susan Wooldridge (born 1952), British actress
William O. Wooldridge (1922–2012), first Sergeant Major of the United States Army

Place names
 Wooldridge, Eastern Cape, South Africa
Wooldridge, Missouri
Wooldridge, Tennessee
Wooldridge Park (in Austin, Texas)

See also
Woolridge